Arantxa Sánchez Vicario won in the final 6–3, 6–1 against Magüi Serna.

Seeds
A champion seed is indicated in bold text while text in italics indicates the round in which that seed was eliminated.

  Arantxa Sánchez Vicario (champion)
  Chanda Rubin (second round)
  Magüi Serna (final)
  Silvia Farina Elia (semifinals)
  Silvija Talaja (semifinals)
  Ángeles Montolio (second round)
  Rita Grande (first round)
  Marta Marrero (second round)

Draw

External links
 2001 Porto Open draw

Singles
Singles
2001 in Portuguese tennis